Woollaston is a small hamlet near to Bradley(where the population taken at the 2011 census can be found) in Staffordshire, England lying some four miles northwest of Penkridge and 2 miles southeast of Church Eaton. It lies in quite flat dairy farming countryside a mile south of Shredicote and a mile west of Mitton. All three villages consist of only a couple of farms and a few cottages scattered along the Church Eaton Road, which runs from Mitton to Church Eaton parallel to Church Eaton Brook, which runs southeastwards towards Penkridge being a tributary of the River Penk.

External links
 Views of Woollaston

Villages in Staffordshire